was a Japanese film director.

Filmography
 Moeru Tairiku (1968)
 Cruel Female Love Suicide (1970)
 Apartment Wife: Affair In the Afternoon (1971)
 Affair at Twilight (1972)
 Drifter's Affair (1972)
 Sigh of Roses (1972)
 Apartment Wife: Secret Rendezvous (1972)
 White Skin Glimmering In the Darkness (1972)
 Apartment Wife: Afternoon Bliss (1972)
 Love Affair Exposed (1972)
 Afternoon Affair: Rear Window (1972)
 Confessions of an Adolescent Wife: Shocking! (1973)
 Confessions of an Adolescent Wife: Climax! (1973)
 Apartment Wife: Playing with Fire (1973)
 Injū no yado (1973)
 Sex-Crime Coast: School of Piranha (1973)
 Wandering Seagull: Night In Kushiro (1973)
 Apartment Wife: Afternoon Seduction (1974)
 Gypsy Rose: A Docu-Drama (1974)
 Hihon: midaregumo (1974)
 Karūserumaki: yoru wa watashi o nurasu (1974)
 Morning Frenzy (1974)
 Secret Book: Peeled Egg (1975)
 New Apartment Wife: Prostitution In Building #113 (1975)
 Red Light Tobita Brothel (1975)
 Trembling (1975)
 New Lesbian World: Rapture (1975)
 Lady Ecstasy: Pleasure Profound (1976)
 Apartment Wife: Flesh Financing (1976)
 Cage of Lust: Wives' Afternoon (1976)
 Exposure: Call Girl's Testimony (1976)
 Midsummer Night's Affair: Bliss (1976)
 Lusty Wife: Temptation of Flesh (1976)
 Tissue Paper By the Geisha's Pillow (1977)
 The Red Petal Is Wet (1977)
 Lady Black Rose (1978)
 Rope Cosmetology (1978)
 Rope and Skin (1979)

References

External links
 

1930 births
2017 deaths
People from Shiga Prefecture
Japanese film directors
Pink film directors